WYZB (branded as "Nash FM 105.5") is a radio station serving the Fort Walton Beach, Florida area with a modern country format. This station broadcasts on FM frequency 105.5 MHz and is under ownership of Cumulus Media.

External links
Nash FM 105.5 - Official website

Country radio stations in the United States
YZB
Cumulus Media radio stations
1986 establishments in Florida
Radio stations established in 1986